Imke David (born 4 June 1967 in Erlangen, Germany) is a German viol player, author, Professor and Ensemble-Member.

Early life 
David grew up in Erlangen in a musical family. As a six-year-old she was a member of the seven-member viol ensemble made up of her family members.

As a gifted student, she was admitted as a junior student in 1986. She studied Early Music, majoring in viol with Jordi Savall at the Schola Cantorum Basiliensis. After a short while, she became a steady member of Savall's ensemble Hesperion XX.

Major influences during her study in Basel were Jesper Christensen, Andreas Staier and René Jacobs.

Career 
Professional appearances followed with Cantus Cölln, Concerto Palatino, Concerto Vocale under the direction of René Jacobs, Hesperion XXI under the direction of Jordi Savall, Le Concert des Nations. She was the first viol player to be awarded a prize at the international competition for Early Music in Bruges.

David performs internationally as a viol player and has taken part in radio broadcasts and CD recordings. From 1991 to 1996, compositions for solo viol were composed for her by composer Art Clay. She premiered and recorded these pieces. With the project Broken Words, a text and music - performance with Urs Jaeggi (text), Art Clay (live electronics) and David ( Air-Bow), she explored  the use of the viol in modern settings.

She researched the lirone, an Italian string instrument from the Early Baroque. This 13-string instrument was used for continuo, but few people can now play it. David has developed a chordal style of playing. In this technique, the aim is to produce a timbre similar to the organ, suitable for the accompaniment of laments and recitatives in the works of Claudio Monteverdi and his contemporaries.

In 2010 David became a professor of viol, Lirone and violone at the Department of Early Music of the Hochschule für Musik Franz Liszt. There, she teaches in addition the interpretation of the different styles of European Renaissance music early and High Baroque, She is active in international competitions as a judge.

Honors and awards
 Award winner, Solo Competition for Early Music in Brügge 1996
 Award Winner,  Orpheuskonzerte Viola da Gamba 1996 in Zürich

Written work
 'The Six String Lira da Gamba, Orfeo-Verlag, München 1999,

Discography
 Lachen Weinen Trauern Singen, Imke David Viola da Gamba Solo. David Hume, Johannes Schenck, Georg Philipp Telemann, Karl Friedrich Abel u.a., 1991
 Musik for Seven Strings - Imke David Viola da Gamba Solo, Jörg-Andreas Bötticher, Harpsichord, Kompositionen Art Clay, 1995
 Werke Mit Obligatem Cembalo. Aus Den Essercizii Musici von Georg Philipp Telemann, Schola Cantorum Basiliensis, 1993
 Sechs Sonaten für Blockflöte und Basso Continuo von Ignazio Sieber
 Psalmen Davids von Heinrich Schütz mit Konrad Junghänel und Cantus Cölln 2013

References

External links

1967 births
Living people
German viol players
20th-century German women musicians
21st-century German women musicians